"Young Turks" is a song by Rod Stewart that first appeared in 1981 on his album Tonight I'm Yours. The track presented Stewart backed by a new synth-pop and new wave sound, in part influenced by acts like Devo. The term young Turk, which originates from the early 20th-century secular nationalist reform party of the same name, is slang for a rebellious youth who acts contrary to what is deemed normal by society. The actual phrase "young Turks" is in fact never heard in the song, the chorus instead centering on the phrase "young hearts, be free, tonight", leading to the song frequently being misidentified as "Young Hearts" or "Young Hearts Be Free".

The music for the song was composed by Carmine Appice, Duane Hitchings, and Kevin Savigar, with lyrics written by Stewart. The song, which was released as the first US single (second in the UK) from Tonight I’m Yours, was produced with synthesizers and a hi-hat played over a drum machine.  Billboard said that it was "the kind of song Stewart is best at: melodic, lyrical and a bit harder than a ballad."  Record World said that "Stewart hitches onto a brisk beat and trades in his vocal gravel for an attractive light tenor." 

On the Billboard Hot 100, "Young Turks" debuted at No. 61 on 17 October 1981 and peaked at No. 5 on 19 December 1981 – 9 January 1982. The song peaked at No. 11 on the UK Singles Chart and also was a Top 5 hit in Australia, Belgium, Israel (No. 1) and Canada. Released a few months after MTV went on the air, it was the first video containing breakdancing to be played by that station.

Personnel
Rod Stewart – lead and backing vocals
Jim Cregan – lead guitar and backing vocals
 Jay Davis – bass
Kevin Savigar – synthesizers, clavinet
 Duane Hitchings – synthesizers, electric piano
Carmine Appice – drums (hi-hat), Oberheim DMX programming and backing vocals
Linda Lewis - backing vocals

Music videos
The video, directed by Russell Mulcahy, produced by Simon Fields & Paul Flattery and choreographed by Kenny Ortega, was filmed in the central downtown area of Los Angeles in the summer of 1981.  The runaway couple ("Billy", played by Dale Pauley, and "Patti", played by Elizabeth Daily) mentioned in the song is juxtaposed by a group of dancers who seemingly intermix with them throughout the video. About 14 seconds after the start of the video, Billy emerges from one floor above the now long abandoned Licha's Santa Fe Grill, in reality at the northwest corner of 7th and Santa Fe Streets in Los Angeles, and descends a ladder before dropping the last few feet down to the street. A little more than one-third of the way through the song, Billy and Patti are shoved toward the entrance of the Hotel Hayward, in reality at the west corner of 6th and Spring Streets, again in Los Angeles, between a mile and a half and two miles to the northwest. The dancers eventually end up in a railway yard just to the east of the grill, to where the couple has returned and Rod Stewart is singing the last half of the song.

Stewart's videotaped rooftop performance of the song in Los Angeles (different from the aforementioned music video) appeared about one-third of the way through Dick Clark's three-hour American Bandstand 30th Anniversary Special Episode on 30 October 1981.

Chart performance

Weekly charts

Year-end charts

References

1981 singles
1981 songs
1982 singles
British new wave songs
British synth-pop songs
Rod Stewart songs
Warner Records singles
Music videos directed by Russell Mulcahy
Songs written by Kevin Savigar
Songs written by Duane Hitchings
Songs written by Carmine Appice
Songs written by Rod Stewart
Songs about teenagers